

Results

References

Regional and municipal elections in Colombia
2011 elections in South America
2011 in Colombia